Renhe Station is a metro station on Line 3 on the Guangzhou Metro. The station is located under China National Highway 106 (Renhe Section) in Renhe Town, Baiyun District. It started operation on 30October 2010.

References

Railway stations in China opened in 2010
Guangzhou Metro stations in Baiyun District